Critical Energy is a live album by Threshold, released in 2004.

Track list

Disc 1

 "Phenomenon"  (6.06)
 "Oceanbound"  (6.25)
 "Choices"  (8.41)
 "Angels"  (6.47)
 "Falling Away"  (7.09)
 "Virtual Isolation"  (6.10)
 "Innocent"  (4.21)
 "Long Way Home"  (6.06)
 "Fragmentation"  (7.00)

Disc 2
 "Clear"  (3.41)
 "Life Flow"  (3.53)
 "Narcissus"  (6.03)
 "Sunseeker"  (5.25)
 "The Latent Gene"   (7.57)
 "Light And Space"  (6.15)
 "Sunrise On Mars"  (5.29)
 "Paradox"  (9.25)
 "Sanity's End"  (10.16)

DVD features
Complete concert footage (approx. 2 hours)
Stereo and 5.1 surround sound
Commentary by Karl Groom and Richard West
Critical Moments tour documentary
Additional concert footage from ProgPower USA 2002:
Light And Space / The Latent Gene / The Ravages Of Time 
Photo gallery by Sy Wooks Seddon

Musicians
 Andrew McDermott - vocals
 Karl Groom - guitar
 Nick Midson - guitar
 Richard West - keyboard
 Steve Anderson - bass guitar
 Johanne James - drums

2004 live albums
2004 video albums
Live video albums
Threshold (band) albums